Meillassoux is a surname, and may refer to:

Claude Meillassoux (1925–2005), French anthropologist
Pierre Meillassoux (born 1928), French architect
Quentin Meillassoux (born 1967), French philosopher